Jamila Reinhardt (born November 17, 1989) is an American rugby union player. She is a member of the San Diego Surfers Women's Rugby Club and Women's Premier League national champion. She was named in the Eagles 2017 Women's Rugby World Cup squad.

Reinhardt attended Menlo-Atherton High School. She graduated from the California State University Maritime Academy and is a lieutenant in the United States Navy. She began her rugby career in her senior year of college. She previously participated in basketball, shot put and discus.

References

External links 
 Jamila Reinhardt at USA Rugby

1989 births
Living people
American female rugby union players
United States women's international rugby union players
California State University Maritime Academy alumni
21st-century American women